The Puna de Atacama or Atacama Plateau is an arid high plateau, in the Andes of northern Chile (15%) and Argentina (85%). Geomorphologist Walther Penck based his Grossfalt landform association on Puna de Atacama.

Geography

In Argentina, Puna's territory is extended in the provinces of Salta, Jujuy, and western Catamarca. In Chile, it is included in the regions of Antofagasta and north-eastern Atacama.

International borders

Before the War of the Pacific (1879–1883), the region belonged to Bolivia.  In 1898, it was ceded to Argentina in exchange for recognition of Tarija as part of Bolivia. Chile, which had annexed the Litoral Province from Bolivia, declared the exchange illegal. The border was defined in 1899 after the Puna de Atacama dispute. Of the 75,000 km2 in dispute, 64,000 (85%) were awarded to Argentina and 11,000 (15%) to Chile.

See also
Atacama Desert
Altiplano
Altiplano–Puna volcanic complex
Salar de Atacama
Salar de Arizaro
Puna grassland
Tren a las Nubes
Salta–Antofagasta railway

References

Plateaus of the Andes
Atacama Desert
Plateaus of Argentina
Plateaus of Chile
Landforms of Argentina
Landforms of Antofagasta Region
Landforms of Atacama Region
Landforms of Salta Province
Landforms of Jujuy Province
Landforms of Catamarca Province
Natural regions of South America
Puna de Atacama